Paballo Mogoera (born 8 January 1995) is a South African cricketer. He made his first-class debut for Free State in the 2015–16 Sunfoil 3-Day Cup on 10 March 2016. He made his List A debut for Free State in the 2015–16 CSA Provincial One-Day Challenge on 13 March 2016. In September 2019, he was named in Free State's squad for the 2019–20 CSA Provincial T20 Cup. He made his Twenty20 debut for Free State in the 2019–20 CSA Provincial T20 Cup on 13 September 2019.

References

External links
 

1995 births
Living people
South African cricketers
Free State cricketers
Place of birth missing (living people)